Yevhen Yevhenovych Protasov (born 23 July 1997) is a Ukrainian professional footballer who plays for Sūduva.

Club career
Protasov made his the Ukrainian Premier League debut in a game against FC Stal Kamianske for FC Oleksandriya on 17 February 2018.

On 17 January 2022 he signed with Lithuanian side Sūduva Club.

Honours
Sūduva
Lithuanian Supercup: 2022

References

External links
 
 

1997 births
Living people
People from Melitopol
Ukrainian footballers
Ukraine under-21 international footballers
Association football midfielders
FC Zorya Luhansk players
FC Oleksandriya players
FC Volyn Lutsk players
FC Metalist 1925 Kharkiv players
FK Sūduva Marijampolė players
Ukrainian Premier League players
Ukrainian First League players
A Lyga players
Ukrainian expatriate footballers
Expatriate footballers in Lithuania
Ukrainian expatriate sportspeople in Lithuania
Sportspeople from Zaporizhzhia Oblast